Kolonia Fryderyk  is a village in Gmina Gorzyce, Wodzisław County, Silesian Voivodeship, Poland. It has a population of 1,105 (2006).

It was founded in 1911 as a coal mining settlement. Construction of the Friedrich - Schacht coal mine had begun in 1913 and it began operating for war purposes in 1916. It was closed in 1923.

External links 
  Information about village at Gmina Gorzyce website

Villages in Wodzisław County